The Monitor is a newspaper in McAllen, Texas that covers Starr and Hidalgo counties. It circulates about 36,000 copies daily, according to the Audit Bureau of Circulations. It was owned by Freedom Communications until 2012, when Freedom papers in Texas were sold to AIM Media Texas.

The Monitor's Spanish-language sister paper, La Frontera, shut down in 2009. It shares content with the Valley Morning Star and The Brownsville Herald. Both are also owned by AIM Media Texas.

Both its former publisher, M. Olaf Frandsen, and its former editor in chief, Steve Fagan, have worked at Pulitzer-winning newspapers. Frandsen was editor in chief of the Odessa American in 1988, when the paper won the Pulitzer for spot news photography. Frandsen now is editor and publisher of the Salina, KS, Journal, a member of Harris Enterprises Inc.

In 2017 The Monitor partnered with Quartz to report on the issues of climate change in McAllen and Reynosa. The project was funded by a grant from The Center for Cooperative Media.

In 2021 The Monitor merged online with the Valley Morning Star and The Brownsville Herald.

References

External links

 
 Official The Monitor mobile site

Daily newspapers published in Texas
Hidalgo County, Texas
Mass media in McAllen, Texas
Freedom Communications
1909 establishments in Texas
Companies based in McAllen